Tonite... the Singles Bar is a compilation album by Gallon Drunk, released in 1991 through Clawfist. It contains several of the band's early singles dating back to 1988.

Track listing

Personnel 
Gallon Drunk
Joe Byfield – maracas
Nick Coombes – drums
Mike Delanian – bass guitar, drums, maracas
James Johnston – vocals, guitar, organ
Production and additional personnel
Gallon Drunk – production, engineering
Tony Harris – production, engineering
Geoffrey Perrin – engineering on "Ruby" and "Gallon Drunk"
Steve Mack – engineering on "The Last Gasp (Safty)"

References

External links 
 

1991 compilation albums
Gallon Drunk albums